The 2019 Indian general election were held for the 5 Lok Sabha seats in Uttarakhand on 11 April 2019 to constitute the 17th Lok Sabha.

Candidates 
Major election candidates are:

Opinion polls

Results

Party wise

Constituency wise

Assembly segments wise lead of parties

See also 
 Elections in Uttarakhand
 Politics of Uttarakhand
 2019 Indian general election
 17th Lok Sabha
 List of members of the 17th Lok Sabha

References

External links
Election Commission of India
 Uttarakhand Lok Sabha Election 2019

Uttarakhand
Indian general elections in Uttarakhand